The New Britain pitta (Erythropitta gazellae) is a species of the pitta. It was considered a subspecies of the Bismarck pitta, and some taxonomic authorities still consider it so. It is endemic to New Britain in Papua New Guinea. Its natural habitat is subtropical or tropical moist lowland forests.  It is threatened by habitat loss.

References

New Britain pitta
Birds of New Britain
New Britain pitta